Lisa Jenn Bigelow is an American writer of children's books and young adult fiction. Her middle-grade novel Hazel's Theory of Evolution won the 2020 Lambda Literary Award for Children's and Young Adult Literature.

Personal life 
Bigelow was raised in Kalamazoo, Michigan. She currently lives near Chicago. She can play piano, guitar, and harmonica. Bigelow graduated from Carnegie Mellon University and the University of Illinois Urbana-Champaign.

Career 
While she's not writing, Bigelow works as a youth librarian in the Chicago metropolitan area.

Publications 

 Starting from Here (September 2012)
 Drum Roll, Please (June 2018)
 Hazel’s Theory of Evolution (October 2019)
 This Is Our Rainbow (October 2021)

Awards and honors 
Drum Roll, Please is a Junior Library Guild selection.

References

External links 

 Official website

Living people
University of Illinois alumni
Carnegie Mellon University alumni
Writers from Michigan
Writers from Kalamazoo, Michigan
21st-century American novelists
21st-century American women writers
American writers of young adult literature
Year of birth missing (living people)
American women novelists